79 (seventy-nine) is the natural number following 78 and preceding 80.

In mathematics
79 is:

 An odd number.
 The smallest number that can not be represented as a sum of fewer than 19 fourth powers.
 An isolated prime without a twin prime, as 77 and 81 are composite.
 The smallest prime number p for which the real quadratic field Q[] has class number greater than 1 (namely 3).
 A cousin prime with 83.
 An emirp in base 10, because the reverse of 79, 97, is also a prime.
 A Fortunate prime.
 A circular prime.
 A prime number that is also a Gaussian prime (since it is of the form ).
 A happy prime.
 A Higgs prime.
 A lucky prime.
 A permutable prime, with ninety-seven.
 A Pillai prime, because 23! + 1 is divisible by 79, but 79 is not one more than a multiple of 23.
 A regular prime.
 A right-truncatable prime, because when the last digit (9) is removed, the remaining number (7) is still prime.
 A sexy prime (with 73).
 The n value of the Wagstaff prime 201487636602438195784363.
 Similarly to how the decimal expansion of 1/89 gives Fibonacci numbers, 1/79 gives Pell numbers, that is, 
 A Leyland number of the second kind.

In science
 The atomic number of the chemical element gold (Au) is 79.

In astronomy
 Messier object 79 (M79), a magnitude 8.5 globular cluster in the constellation Lepus
 New General Catalogue object 79 (NGC 79), a galaxy in the constellation Andromeda

In other fields

 Live Seventy Nine, an album by Hawkwind
 The years 79 BC, AD 79 or 1979
 The number of the French department Deux-Sèvres
 The ASCII code of the capital letter O

References

Integers